Manducus is a genus of bristlemouths.

Species
There are currently two recognized species in this genus:
 Manducus greyae (R. K. Johnson, 1970)
 Manducus maderensis (J. Y. Johnson, 1890)

References

Gonostomatidae
Marine fish genera
Taxa named by George Brown Goode
Taxa named by Tarleton Hoffman Bean